The IT industry competitiveness index, published online by the Business Software Association, measures factors like supply of skills, an innovation-friendly culture, world-class technology infrastructure, a robust legal regime and well-balanced government support to IT industry, and a competition-friendly business environment. The countries that possess these capabilities do have high performance IT industries. Those countries possessing most of these “competitiveness enablers” are also home to high-performance IT industries.

References

External links
IT industry competitive index 2011
The IT Competitiveness Quotient (ITcQ) shows on a scale of 0 to 100 how competitive the company is with IT.

Information economy